Indian civil servants includes five principal sub-categories of officials: 

Administrators of the native states of India
Administrators of British India who came as servants of the East India Company before the formation of the ICS in 1853
Members of the former Indian Civil Service (ICS) as well as the superior central and nationalised services in British India, who joined the civil service after 1853. 
Dewans of the former Indian Princely States
Employees of the Central Civil Services of the present Government of India, and respective Indian state governments including the
 Indian Administrative Service
 Indian Forest Service
 Indian Police Service 
 Technocrats and Academic Administrators who have held official positions of the Government of India and the respective state governments of the Indian Union.

For lists of civil servants of respective cadres see: 

List of Chief Secretaries of Rajasthan

In popular culture
Since early 20th-century, Indian civil servants are colloquially called "babus", while Indian bureaucracy is called "babudom", as in the "rule of babus", especially in Indian media.

See also
 :Category:Indian civil servants

References 

Indian civil servants